The R369 is a Regional Route in South Africa that connects the R357 near Prieska with Colesberg via Hopetown.

Route 
The R369 begins at a junction with the R357 about 35 kilometres east of Prieska. It begins by going eastwards and after about 15 kilometres, it meets the western terminus of the R387. It then continues east for about 90 kilometres to meet the N12 at a staggered intersection in Hopetown. It continues south-east, following the Orange River, to the town of Orania, before again intersecting with the R387, this time at its eastern terminus. The route continues south-east and becomes co-signed with the R48 southwards for 19 kilometres. While co-signed with the R48, it bypasses Vanderkloof to the west and passes through Petrusville. Leaving the R48 south of Petrusvile, the route heads south-south-east to end near Colesberg at an interchange with the N1, the R717 and the R58.

Note: Between Petrusville and Colesberg it is mostly a gravel road.

External links
 Routes Travel Info

References

Regional Routes in the Northern Cape